William J. Caunitz (1933–1996) was a New York City Police Department officer who used his own experiences to write best-selling thrillers.

After serving in the United States Marine Corps, and working for an insurance company, he joined the NYPD in his twenties. He first worked as a patrolman, and eventually rose through the ranks to become a lieutenant, followed by an assignment as a detective squad commander. Caunitz wrote with great authenticity when describing precinct day-to-day life in his novels. The New York Times has compared him to Joseph Wambaugh.

After many rewrites, his first novel One Police Plaza came out in 1984. It was made into a television film starring Robert Conrad in 1986. In 1988 the film got a sequel, The Red Spider. His novels usually center around one or two police officers that follow detailed police procedures to solve a crime, and he also used some sensational elements of thrillers. He did not write with an outline, preferring to let the plot evolve unpredictably as he was writing.

Caunitz died in 1996 from pulmonary fibrosis His last novel, Chains of Command, was half-completed at the time of his death and finished by Christopher Newman.

Bibliography
One Police Plaza (1984)
Suspects (1986)
Black Sand (1989)
Exceptional Clearance (1991)
Cleopatra Gold (1993)
Pigtown (1995)
Chains of Command (1999)

External links

 1991 audio interview with William Caunitz at Wired for Books.org by Don Swaim

References

1933 births
1996 deaths
New York City Police Department officers
20th-century American novelists
American police detectives
United States Marines
American male novelists
20th-century American male writers
Novelists from New York (state)